The canton of Saint-Cyr-sur-Loire is an administrative division of the Indre-et-Loire department, central France. Its borders were modified at the French canton reorganisation which came into effect in March 2015. Its seat is in Saint-Cyr-sur-Loire.

It consists of the following communes:
Fondettes
Luynes
La Membrolle-sur-Choisille
Saint-Cyr-sur-Loire
Saint-Étienne-de-Chigny

References

Cantons of Indre-et-Loire